The Alliance of Democracies Foundation (AoD) is a non-profit organisation dedicated to the advancement of democracy and free markets across the globe. It was established in December 2017 by former NATO Secretary General and former Danish Prime Minister Anders Fogh Rasmussen together with businessman Fritz Schur and lawyer Klaus Søgaard.

According to its founder, Anders Fogh Rasmussen, the United States is retreating from the world stage, leaving behind a vacuum that is filled by autocrats like Vladimir Putin, Kim Jong-un, and Bashar al-Assad. Democracy is under pressure from protectionism, populism, nationalism, terrorism, and autocracy. Against this backdrop, the Alliance of Democracies foundation seeks to unite world democracies. According to Rasmussen, the new alliance of democracies would not be a new U.N. but rather an organisation that would supplement it.

The Foundation runs three programs:

The Copenhagen Democracy Summit
The Copenhagen Democracy Summit is a conference bringing together political and business leaders, including current and former heads of government, from the world's democracies. In light of a decline of liberal democracies across the world, the aim is to be a top international forum for analysis on the security and economic challenges facing the democratic world as well as a forum for analysis on the interplay between technology and democratic norms. The first annual Copenhagen Democracy Summit took place in Copenhagen on July 22, 2018. Among those who attended were the then-Danish Prime Minister Lars Løkke Rasmussen, Joe Biden, Tony Blair, Stephen Harper, Felipe Calderón, José María Aznar, and former Estonian President Toomas Ilves. A total of 350 participants attended from over 40 countries. One of the publications released at the conference concluded that people's trust in government is lower in democracies than in non-democratic states. The Alliance of Democracies seeks to organise a Copenhagen Democracy Summit every summer and a similar winter conference in Denver, Colorado.

The Expeditionary Economics Program
The Expeditionary Economics Program is rooted in Cold War efforts by the United States to strengthen post-war Europe and create a better economic model than the communist one offered by the Soviet Union. The program supports entrepreneurial projects in developing states, emerging democracies, and post-conflict areas for the purpose of strengthening democracy in fragile states by developing a local economic base.

The Campaign for Democracy
The Campaign for Democracy seeks to connect supporters of democracy across the world and build an intellectual movement for democracy through a network of local associations, online presence, media engagement, and support for dissidents.

On the sidelines of the Copenhagen Democracy Summit Anders Fogh Rasmussen together with Michael Chertoff launched the Transatlantic Commission on Election Integrity, which has Joe Biden, Nick Clegg, Toomas Ilves, and Felipe Calderón among its members. The commission is tasked with bolstering the defences of Western democracies against outside interference.

See also 

 Democracy Index

References

External links 

 

Political organizations established in 2017
Democracy promotion